Franklin, Wisconsin can refer to several places:

Franklin, Jackson County, Wisconsin, a town
Franklin (community), Jackson County, Wisconsin, an unincorporated community
Franklin, Kewaunee County, Wisconsin, a town
Franklin, Manitowoc County, Wisconsin, a town
Franklin, Milwaukee County, Wisconsin, a city
Franklin, Sauk County, Wisconsin, a town
Franklin, Sheboygan County, Wisconsin, an unincorporated community
Franklin, Vernon County, Wisconsin, a town